Gheorghe Bogdan can refer to:
George Bogdan (1859–1930), Romanian physician and professor
Gheorghe Bogdan-Duică (1866–1934), Romanian literary critic